The 2004 Nextel All-Star Challenge was the second exhibition stock car race of the 2004 NASCAR Nextel Cup Series and the 20th iteration of the event. The race was held on Saturday, May 22, 2004, in Concord, North Carolina at Lowe's Motor Speedway, a 1.5 miles (2.4 km) permanent quad-oval. The race took the scheduled 90 laps to complete. At race's end, Matt Kenseth, driving for Roush Racing, would complete a late race pass of eventual second-place driver, Penske-Jasper Racing driver Ryan Newman to win his first and only Nextel All-Star Challenge win. To fill out the podium, Tony Stewart of Joe Gibbs Racing finished third.

Background 

Lowe's Motor Speedway is a motorsports complex located in Concord, North Carolina, United States 13 miles from Charlotte, North Carolina. The complex features a 1.5 miles (2.4 km) quad oval track that hosts NASCAR racing including the prestigious Coca-Cola 600 on Memorial Day weekend and the NEXTEL All-Star Challenge, as well as the UAW-GM Quality 500. The speedway was built in 1959 by Bruton Smith and is considered the home track for NASCAR with many race teams located in the Charlotte area. The track is owned and operated by Speedway Motorsports Inc. (SMI) with Marcus G. Smith (son of Bruton Smith) as track president.

Format and eligibility 
The 90 laps of the Nextel All-Star Challenge was divided into three segments. Caution laps between segment breaks were not counted. The first segment was 40 laps long. Mandatory 10-minute pit stops/breaks were implemented in between both segment breaks. During the first 10-minute break, a random ping pong ball (each ball would have one NASCAR on Fox announcer or pit reporter on it) picked by Chris Myers would lead Myers to open a giant, promotional Nextel flip phone of the corresponding announcer. Each phone had a number that would decide how many cars would be inverted to start Segment 2, a 30-lap segment. After the second 10-minute break, drivers would race in a 20-lap shootout to decide the winner of the Nextel All-Star Challenge.

Drivers who had won in the previous season and the first 11 eleven races of the current season were automatically eligible to qualify for the Nextel All-Star Challenge. In addition, previous champions and former Nextel All-Star Challenge winners within the last 10 years (1994-2003) were also automatically eligible.

Teams who were not automatically eligible to qualify, but still wanted to have a chance at entering the Nextel All-Star Challenge were made to race in a qualifying race called the Nextel Open, a 30-lap shootout event where the winner of the event would qualify to race in the Nextel All-Star Challenge. Teams who were in the Top 50 in the 2003 NASCAR Winston Cup Series owner's points standings were allowed to race in the Nextel Open. In addition, a televote was made open to the public where the driver who got the most votes from the public would also qualify to move on to the Nextel All-Star Challenge.

Entry list

Nextel Open

Nextel All-Star Challenge

Practice

Nextel Open first practice 
The first Nextel Open practice was held on Friday, May 22, at 11:45 AM EST, and would last for 45 minutes.

Nextel Open second and final practice 
The second and final practice for the Nextel Open, sometimes known as Happy Hour, was held on Friday, May 22, at 1:15 PM EST, and would last for 45 minutes.

Nextel All-Star Challenge practice 
The only practice session for the Nextel All-Star Challenge was held on Friday, May 22, at 2:15 PM EST, and would last for 45 minutes.

Qualifying

Nextel Open 
Qualifying for the Nextel Open was held on Friday, May 21, at 6:05 PM EST. Each driver would have two laps to set a fastest time; the fastest of the two would count as their official qualifying lap.

Nextel All-Star Challenge 
Qualifying for the Nextel All-Star Challenge was held on Friday, May 21, at 7:10 PM EST. Each driver would run 3 laps each, with each driver having to do a mandatory pit stop within those three laps.

Nextel Open results

Nextel All-Star Challenge results

References 

2004 NASCAR Nextel Cup Series
NASCAR races at Charlotte Motor Speedway
May 2004 sports events in the United States
2004 in sports in North Carolina